Cantharellus tenuithrix is a species of Cantharellus found in hardwood forests from Texas to Tennessee and Florida

References

External links

tenuithrix
Fungi described in 2011
Fungi of North America